"Street Singer"  is a song written by Roy Nichols, and performed by American country music band The Strangers.  It was released in April 1970 as the first single from their album Introducing My Friends The Strangers. The B-side was "Mexican Rose," written by Roy Nichols and Norm Hamlet. The lineup of The Strangers during this time was Roy Nichols on lead guitar, Norm Hamlet on pedal steel guitar, Bobby Wayne on rhythm guitar, Dennis Hromek on bass, and Biff Adam on drums. "Street Singer" peaked at number nine on the U.S. Billboard Hot Country Singles chart and peaked at number twenty four on the Bubbling Under Hot 100. It reached number-one on the Canadian RPM Country Tracks in June 1970.

Personnel

The Strangers:
Roy Nichols – lead guitar
Norman Hamlet – steel guitar, dobro
Bobby Wayne - rhythm guitar
Dennis Hromek – bass
Biff Adam  – drums

with:
Merle Haggard– vocals

Chart performance

References

1970 singles
Merle Haggard songs
Song recordings produced by Ken Nelson (American record producer)
Capitol Records singles
1970 songs